The 2017 European Champions Cup is a European baseball competition, that was held from June 7, to 11, 2017 in Regensburg, Germany. This is the fifty-fifth iteration of the Cup since its inaugural tournament in 1963.

List of competing teams

Venues

Rosters

First round

Group A 

|}

Group B 

|}

Bottom Four 
Game 1

Game 2

Relegation Game

Final four
Semi-Final 1

Semi-Final 2

3rd Place

Final

Final standings

* Both teams share 5th place.

Statistics leaders

Batting

Pitching

See also 
 European Baseball Championship
 Asia Series
 Caribbean Series
 Baseball awards#Europe

References

External links
Official CEB site
Official Regensburg site
Results site

European Cup (baseball)
International baseball competitions in Europe
2017 in baseball